Earl Bealle Fowler Jr. (September 29, 1925 – February 8, 2008) was a Vice Admiral in the United States Navy.

Secretary of the Navy John Lehman described Fowler in 1988 as one of the "blue suiter superstars" in his book Command of the Seas: Building the 600 Ship Navy.

Education
Fowler earned a bachelor's degree in mechanical engineering from Georgia Tech in February 1946 and a master's degree in electrical engineering from Massachusetts Institute of Technology in 1949.

Fowler attended the six-week Advanced Management Program at Harvard Business School in 1970.

Career
Fowler joined in the United States Navy on May 18, 1943, joining the V-12 Navy College Training Program.
From 1976 to 1980, he was commander of the Naval Electronics Systems Command and from March 1980 to his retirement in June 1985, he was commander of Naval Sea Systems Command.

Awards
 Navy Distinguished Service Medal
Legion of Merit

References

1925 births
2008 deaths
United States Navy vice admirals
Burials at Arlington National Cemetery
Recipients of the Navy Distinguished Service Medal
Recipients of the Legion of Merit
Georgia Tech alumni
NAVSEA commanders
MIT School of Engineering alumni